Jessica Patricia Marie Olérs, born in 1978 in Borlänge, Sweden, to a Swedish father and a Colombian mother. Jessica is a former Miss Sweden and her country's representative at the Miss Universe 1998 pageant. She has studied marketing in Stockholm and New York City. Nowadays she is employed as marketing assistant at a gym in Stockholm, Sweden.

Personal life 
Olérs married in 2016.

References

1978 births
Living people
Miss Sweden winners
Miss Universe 1998 contestants
Swedish beauty pageant winners
Swedish people of Colombian descent